Jesse James Dupree (born Jesse Dupree; September 22, 1962) is an American musician, television personality, and businessman. He is the lead singer, guitarist, and primary songwriter in the rock band Jackyl, founded in 1991.
As a solo performer, he released albums in 2000 and 2008 under the names of "Jesse James Dupree" and "Jesse James Dupree & Dixie Inc.", respectively.

In 2007, Dupree founded Mighty Loud Entertainment, a record label and artist management and marketing company.

With business partner, Michael Ballard, Dupree brought the Full Throttle Saloon television series  to the airwaves on TruTV in 2009. After five successful seasons with TruTV, the series was picked up by Reelz Channel; season premiere on October 3, 2014.   Ballard and his wife, Angie, appear in each episode along with Dupree.

In 2010, Dupree created and launched "Jesse James Spirits", a line of alcoholic beverages that includes the "Jesse James America's Outlaw" brands of beer and bourbon whiskey.

Business interests

Mighty Loud Entertainment
Dupree started Mighty Loud Entertainment, which is a record label and artist management company.  Through Mighty Loud, Dupree is the General Manager of Kiefer Sutherland's label Ironworks and also runs an imprint label as part of the Universal Music system.  Mighty Loud Entertainment manages artists such as Nigel Dupree Band, Jackyl, Wayland, and Babi Mac.

Jesse James Spirits
In 2010, Jesse James Dupree launched the "Jesse James Spirits" line of alcoholic beverage products, whose brands include the no "Jesse James America's Outlaw" brands of whole wheat unfiltered beer (no longer produced) and straight bourbon whiskey. Flavored bourbons (honey flavored and spiced) were introduced to the product line soon afterward.

Bands (active)

Jackyl
Jesse James Dupree is the lead singer and guitarist of the American southern rock band Jackyl from Kennesaw, Georgia. Formed in 1991, the band signed a recording contract with Geffen Records. In 1992, a self-titled debut album was released and went platinum; the band still tours heavily on the festival circuit, in music venues, and on TruTV's reality television series Full Throttle Saloon.

Dupree's most famous routine involves using a chainsaw as a musical instrument during the song "The Lumberjack" and "The Star Spangled Banner". His collection of customized instruments include an electric guitar with a chainsaw attached and a large customized chainsaw powered by a Dodge Hemi engine.

Jesse James Dupree
The 2000 release of Dupree's debut solo project Foot Fetish issued on V2 Records with guitarist John Hayes and bassist Roman Glick (formerly of Brother Cane) brought with it the hard rock/Southern Rock combination expected from Dupree. The single "Mainline", hit #34 on the U.S. Billboard Mainstream Rock Tracks chart.

Jesse James Dupree & Dixie Inc.
2008 brought the release of Rev It Up and Go-Go, an album by Jesse James Dupree & Dixie Inc. Three music videos were released in promotion of the new CD: "Money Lovin' & Speed", "The Party" and "Bite".

In September 2001, Dupree performed and recorded a cover of AC/DC's "Highway to Hell" for the ECW Music CD Anarchy Rocks Extreme Music Volume 2 released on V2 Records.

Television

Full Throttle Saloon
After performing with his band, Jackyl at Full Throttle Saloon in Sturgis, South Dakota, Dupree formed a partnership with Full Throttle Saloon owner, Michael Ballard, and the duo created a reality show, covering the operations of the largest biker bar in the United States.

In addition to being business partners, Dupree and Ballard appear on the show (as themselves), along with several other characters each season. Dupree is the entertainment director and executive producer of the series; he also performs live with his band Jackyl, and performs his own stunts on each episode. Full Throttle Saloon aired its first season on TruTV in 2009, and is in production for future seasons.

The saloon was destroyed by fire in September 2015.

Personal life
In 1989, Jesse had a son named Nigel Thomas Dupree who was the lead vocalist for the Nigel Dupree Band, and was the drummer for Wayland and is now the drummer for Tuk Smith and the Restless Hearts. He also has a stepdaughter, Miranda, and a daughter named Thea. Jesse is married to Penny Dupree.

References

External links 
Official website
Michael Ballard's Full Throttle Saloon website

American rock guitarists
American male guitarists
Living people
Participants in American reality television series
Bourbon whiskey
1962 births
20th-century American guitarists
20th-century American male musicians